Gekås Ullared AB is a Swedish superstore in Ullared, Sweden, founded in 1963 by Göran Karlsson as Ge-kås Manufaktur. In 2013, Malin Helde became CEO of the store, while Boris Lennerhov became CEO of the parent company. The store is visited annually by approximately 4.5 million customers, with the 2007 record of 26,200 for a single day, and the average customer travelling 150 km to get to the store. The store has recently opened a camping ground and a motel to accommodate long distance travellers. It has been known for avoiding conventional advertising, instead relying on word of mouth. For three years starting in 2011, a reality television series, Ullared, was filmed in and around the store. It aired in both Norway and Sweden.

The average customer is a woman, at the age of 43, and buys for approx. $446.20 and visits the store twice a year. On 25 July 2011, the superstore was visited by record 29,500 customers during the day. The longest queue outside the superstore ever was recorded on 30 October 2010, when the queue was longer than 1.4 km. Through Gekås' website, potential customers can monitor the queue length. A barometer as measure indicates the length of the queue outside the building. According to Swedish law the number of visitors in a public building is limited. Additionally two web cameras give additional information about the situation at the entry. In 2011, over 122 million items passed the store's checkouts. The checkout has today about 60 cashiers. The department store's product range consists of over 100,000 items. The value of the goods available in the store is $4.9 million. A fully loaded truck delivers items every 10 minutes.

Gekås central warehouse has a size of 15000 square metres and holds about 10,000 pallets. Every 30 minutes all-year-round a new truck arrives. During peak season the entire store will be emptied in less than two business days.

Facilities belonging to Gekås 

Beside the continuously expanded main building Gekås operates Sweden's largest all-year-round campground is located behind the main building. A lake for swimming with fountain is located in short walking distance from the campground and the huge parking lot.

The check-in was moved from the campground entry to south side of Ullared. A new street now runs directly to the campground to avoid huge traffic of campers through the village.

The parking lot is considered as Sweden's largest parking lot.

Gekås build the recent years a car museum (now closed and market as convention center), a motel and a business hotel. On the road towards Ätran on the outskirt of Ullared is a warehouse with additional parking and dog kindergarten. Buses are running between the different locations for transportation of shoppers.

The former museum showed Göran Karlsson's car collection, where a DeLorean as in the motion picture "Back to the future" was used, was part of the collection.

History 
 1963 – Store founded in Ullared by Göran Karlsson
 1967 – The store moves to a bigger building
 1971 – The store changes location again, to its current location
 1991 – Göran Karlsson sells the company to six employees
 2003 – The market court forbids Göran Karlsson, who had started a competing business, from using the word "Ullared" in his marketing.

Notes 
 Ullared - byn som blev ett varumärke, Torsten Andersson. 2003. Falkenberg: Ge-kås Ullared AB.

References

Further reading

External links 
 Official website

Falkenberg Municipality
Shopping centres in Sweden